Dehnow-e Pain (also Romanized as Dehnow-e Pā’īn; also known as Dehnow) is a village in Qaleh Qazi Rural District, Qaleh Qazi District, Bandar Abbas County, Hormozgan Province, Iran. The village lies about 20 kilometres northeast of Bandar Abbass, served by Road 94. At the 2006 census, its population was 1,884 in 349 families.

References 

Populated places in Bandar Abbas County